Galleh Kur (also Romanized as Galleh Kūr) is a village in Zalaqi-ye Gharbi Rural District, Besharat District, Aligudarz County, Lorestan Province, Iran. At the 2006 census, its population was 33, in 5 families.

References 

Towns and villages in Aligudarz County